Camelhump is a mountain in the Adirondack Mountains region of New York. It is located north-northwest of the Hamlet of Caroga Lake. Kane Mountain is located west, Canada Lake is located southwest and Stewart Lake is located east of Camelhump.

References

Mountains of Fulton County, New York
Mountains of New York (state)